Reinhold Kauder (born 30 January 1950 in Bückeburg) is a former West German slalom canoeist who competed in the late 1960s and early 1970s. At the 1972 Summer Olympics in Munich, he won a silver medal in the C-1 event.

Kauder also won four medals at the ICF Canoe Slalom World Championships with two golds (C-1: 1971, C-1 team: 1969) and two silvers (C-1: 1969, C-1 team: 1971).

References

Sports-reference.com profile

1950 births
Canoeists at the 1972 Summer Olympics
German male canoeists
Living people
Olympic canoeists of West Germany
Olympic silver medalists for West Germany
Olympic medalists in canoeing
Medalists at the 1972 Summer Olympics
Medalists at the ICF Canoe Slalom World Championships
People from Bückeburg
Sportspeople from Lower Saxony